Xenorhipis is a genus of beetles in the family Buprestidae, the jewel beetles. They are native to the Americas.

Species include:

 Xenorhipis acunai (Fisher, 1936)
 Xenorhipis alvarengi Cobos, 1964
 Xenorhipis bajacalifornica Westcott, 2008
 Xenorhipis brendeli LeConte, 1866
 Xenorhipis hidalgoensis Knull, 1952
 Xenorhipis klapperichorum (Nelson, 1978)
 Xenorhipis mexicana Nelson, 1968
 Xenorhipis meyeri Cobos, 1968
 Xenorhipis orinocoensis Bellamy, 1991
 Xenorhipis osborni Knull, 1936
 Xenorhipis parallela (Waterhouse, 1889)
 Xenorhipis prosopis Menley, 1985
 Xenorhipis strandi (Obenberger, 1928)
 Xenorhipis suturalis (Westwood, 1883)
 Xenorhipis vauriei Cazier, 1952

References

Buprestidae genera